A Regional Garden Show is an exhibition on horticulture that takes place  on a regular basis in several German and Austrian states. In Germany, a state horticultural show at the state level is the smaller counterpart to the Bundesgartenschau and the International Horticultural Show, in Austria there is no counterpart so far.

Germany

History 

In the federal states of Baden-Württemberg and Bavaria state garden shows have been held since 1980. In North Rhine-Westphalia there was already a first state garden show in 1970, other German states adopted the model later. In the Austrian federal states Upper Austria and Lower Austria, too, state garden shows have been taking place for several years in alternating two-year cycles.
In 1980, the first cross-border national horticultural show in Germany took place in Ulm/Neu-Ulm (Baden-Württemberg/Bavaria).

Objectives and financing 
The garden shows are intended to improve the quality of life and the ecological climate in the cities. Often the garden shows also serve urban or regional political development objectives. For this reason, garden shows are usually not placed in particularly beautiful landscapes, but rather in areas which are particularly disadvantaged (e.g. due to mining damage), where the garden shows are aimed at supporting structure and help to promote urban planning. The investments which are made within the framework of the regional garden shows help the respective district to become more attractive and usually also to remain attractive. In addition national horticultural shows are today also measures of city marketing, since they can increase as a large meeting lasting half a year also the awareness level of a city.

The municipalities, which often realize a garden show with the help of state funds, take a calculated financial risk. While some state garden shows closed with a "black 0" or even with slight profits, others exceeded their budget and had to be subsidised retrospectively. Particularly in municipalities with a strained budget situation, state garden shows are therefore sometimes controversial despite their long-term advantages, in some cases there have already been citizens' petitions or citizens' decisions.

Garden shows in the individual federal states

Baden-Wüerttemberg 

From 1980 to 2000, the "large horticultural shows" were held annually in Baden-Württemberg. Since 2001, they have been held annually, alternating with the "small state garden shows", the so-called green projects. For green projects, the state provides a subsidy of a maximum of two million euros for green projects and a maximum of five million euros for state horticultural shows, whereby the municipalities also have to make corresponding contributions of their own. By 2010, the state has granted almost 80 million euros in state subsidies. This has resulted in at least three times and in some cases even seven times the amount of investment on the part of the municipalities; they invested around 153 million euros: In the process, around 625 hectares of green spaces were created, redesigned and permanently secured. The State Horticultural Shows and green projects provide the impetus for comprehensive structural developments that create a spirit of optimism in the municipalities and strengthen their economic development. An expert commission will evaluate the applications and assess the submitted concepts on site. The Council of Ministers then awards the state garden shows and green projects in a cabinet meeting.

The last strongly visited State Garden Show in Baden-Württemberg before the introduction of the "Green Projects" in 2001 was the 1992 State Garden Show in the "Gold City" of Pforzheim with a peak number of visitors of 1.6 million. Thereafter, the number of visitors at state level also fell well below one million in each case. For this reason, the state government decided as early as 1996 to carry out the smaller "green projects" in Baden-Württemberg every two years from 2001 onwards. In 2014 Schwäbisch Gmünd set a new record with around 2 million visitors.

 1980: Ulm/Neu-Ulm
 1981: Baden-Baden
 1982: Schwäbisch Hall
 1983: Lörrach – Landschaftspark Grütt
 1984: Reutlingen
 1985: Heilbronn
 1986: Freiburg im Breisgau
 1988: Ettlingen
 1989: Bietigheim-Bissingen
 1990: Sindelfingen
 1991: Hockenheim
 1992: Pforzheim
 1993: IGA Stuttgart
 1994: Bad Dürrheim
 1996: Böblingen
 1997: Mosbach
 1998: Plochingen
 1999: Weil am Rhein
 2000: Singen (Hohentwiel)
 2001: Green Project Pfullendorf
 2002: Ostfildern
 2003: Green Project Nordheim (Württemberg)
 2003: Green Project Tuttlingen
 2004: Kehl und Straßburg – Garten der zwei Ufer
 2005: Green Project Ladenburg
 2006: Heidenheim an der Brenz
 2007: Green Project Rheinfelden (Baden)
 2008: Bad Rappenau
 2009: Green Project Rechberghausen
 2010: Villingen-Schwenningen
 2011: Green Project Horb am Neckar 
 2012: Nagold: Grüne Urbanität
 2013: Green Project Sigmaringen
 2014: Schwäbisch Gmünd, Record number of visitors with approx. 2 million
 2015: Green Project Mühlacker
 2016: Öhringen
 2017: Green Project Bad Herrenalb
 2018: Lahr
 2019: Green Project Remstal
 2020: Überlingen
 2021: Green Project Eppingen
 2022: Neuenburg am Rhein
 2023: Green Project Balingen
 2024: Wangen im Allgäu
 2025: Green Project Freudenstadt/Baiersbronn
 2026: Ellwangen
 2027: Green Project Bad Urach
 2028: Rottweil
 2029: Green Project Vaihingen/Enz
 2030: Ulm

Bavaria 
After North Rhine-Westphalia, Bavaria, together with Baden-Württemberg, was the first federal state to hold state garden shows. The Free State initially started in an irregular rhythm with four State Horticultural Shows in Neu-Ulm, Augsburg, Dinkelsbühl and Straubing. Since 1990 the State Garden Shows have been held in Bavaria every two years, at even-numbered years, in addition to the Federal Garden Shows, which take place at odd-numbered years. In the uneven years in between there has been a small horticultural show in Bavaria since 1995 called Nature in the City, in which, similar to the State Horticultural Shows, but on a smaller scale, improvements in green and recreational structures form the framework for the horticultural show.

Up to and including 2015, the Free State and the EU have provided 83 million euros in funding for Bavarian garden shows, almost 23 million visitors have been recorded and around 460 hectares of public green spaces have been created over these years. Cities and municipalities can apply to the Society for the Promotion of the Bavarian State Horticultural Shows (FÖG) to organise a garden show. The awarding procedure and also the type and implementation of the state funding has been criticised on numerous occasions. Unter anderem hielt der Bayerische Oberste Rechnungshof die Vergabe der Gartenschauen in Bayern für intransparent und empfahl, sie auf eine neue Grundlage zu stellen, was auch geschah.

 1980: Regional Garden Show Neu-Ulm/Ulm
 1985: Regional Garden Show Augsburg
 1988: Regional Garden Show Dinkelsbühl
 1989: Regional Garden Show Straubing
 1990: Regional Garden Show Würzburg with 2.5 million visitors is considered the most visited Bavarian State Garden Show
 1992: Regional Garden Show Ingolstadt
 1994: Regional Garden Show Hof (Saale)
 1995: Small Regional Garden Show Waldkraiburg
 1996: Regional Garden Show Amberg
 1997: Small Regional Garden Show Arnstein
 1998: Regional Garden Show Neumarkt in der Oberpfalz
 1999: Small Regional Garden Show Neustadt bei Coburg
 2000: Regional Garden Show Memmingen, (1.3 million visitors)
 2001: Small Regional Garden Show Cham (Oberpfalz)
 2002: Regional Garden Show Kronach
 2003: Small Regional Garden Show Roth
 2004: Burghausen
 2006: Regional Garden Show Marktredwitz and Cheb
 2007: Small Regional Garden Show Waldkirchen
 2008: Regional Garden Show Neu-Ulm (mit großen städtebaulichen Investitionen im Rahmen des Projekts Neu-Ulm 21)
 2009: Small Regional Garden Show Rain
 2010: Regional Garden Show Rosenheim, „Innspiration"
 2011: Small Regional Garden Show Kitzingen
 2012: Regional Garden Sho Bamberg
 2013: Small Regional Garden Show Tirschenreuth
 2014: Regional Garden Show Deggendorf
 2015: Small Regional Garden Show Alzenau
 2016: Regional Garden Show Bayreuth
 2017: Small Regional Garden Show Pfaffenhofen an der Ilm
 2018: Regional Garden Show Würzburg
 2019: Small Regional Garden Show Wassertrüdingen
 2020: Regional Garden Show Ingolstadt
 2021: Small Regional Garden Show Lindau (Bodensee), „Ring aus Inselgärten – Natur in der Stadt 2021"
 2022: Regional Garden Show Freyung
 2024: Regional Garden Show Kirchheim
 2025: Regional Garden Show Furth im Wald

Brandenburg 

 2000 Luckau
 2002 Eberswalde 
 2006 Rathenow, „Den Farben auf der Spur" (On the trail of colours)
 2009 Oranienburg, „Traumlandschaften einer Kurfürstin" (Dreamscapes of an Electress)
 2013 Prenzlau, „Die grüne Wonne" (The green delight)
 2019 Wittstock/Dosse „Grüne Bürgerstadt" (Green civil town)
 2022 Beelitz „Gartenfest für alle Sinne" (Garden party for all senses)

Hesse 
 1994: Fulda „Der Garten Hessens" (The Garden of Hesse)
 2002: Hanau „Mit allen Sinnen erleben!" (Experience with all senses!)
 2006: Bad Wildungen
 2010: Bad Nauheim „Traumhafte Gärten im Herzen der Stadt" (Fantastic gardens in the heart of the city)
 2014: Gießen „Auf zu neuen Ufern" (Off to new shores)
 2018: Bad Schwalbach „Natur erleben. Natürlich Leben" (Experience nature. Live naturally.)
 2023: Fulda

Mecklenburg-Western Pomerania 

 2002: Wismar

Mecklenburg-Western Pomerania is the only federal state that has so far hosted only one state garden show. A show was to take place in the landscape park Brodaer Höhe of Neubrandenburg, but it did not go beyond the design phase. Originally, a further State Garden Show was scheduled for 2014/2015. This was initially suspended because the applicants Güstrow and Putbus were unable to present a financially sustainable concept.

In the year 2003 an International Horticultural Exhibition was held in Rostock. In Schwerin a successful National Garden Show followed in 2009. For 2025 Schwerin was awarded the contract by the BUGA Society for a further Federal Horticultural Show, which is to further develop the 2009 concept and make the southern shore of Lake Schwerin more accessible to residents and visitors. A referendum was to decide on the organisation of the show on the election date of the Bundestag elections 2017 in September. After the state government failed to provide the financial means, the BUGA 2025 was returned to the German National Garden Show Society mbH (DBG) 2017. On July 26, 2018, Rostock launched a BUGA application and was officially awarded the contract to host the National Garden Show 2025 on September 10, 2018.

Lower Saxony 

 2002: Bad Zwischenahn, „Park of gardens"
 2004: Wolfsburg
 2006: Winsen (Luhe)
 2010: Bad Essen
 2014: Papenburg
 2018: Bad Iburg
 2022: Bad Gandersheim

North Rhine-Westphalia 
 1970: Grefrath
 1972: Mechernich-Kommern, Mühlenpark
 1974: Nümbrecht
 1980: Xanten, LVR Archaeological Park Xanten
 1984: Hamm, Maximilianpark
 1988: Rheda-Wiedenbrück, Flora Westfalica
 1992: Mülheim an der Ruhr, MüGa-Park
 1994: Paderborn, Schloss- und Auenpark
 1995: Grevenbroich, Stadtpark
 1996: Lünen, „LaGaLü"
 1998: Jülich, Brückenkopfpark
 1999: Oberhausen, „Olga"
 2000: Bad Oeynhausen/Löhne, Aqua Magica
 2001: Oelde, „Blütenzauber & Kinderträume", Vier-Jahreszeiten-Park
 2002: Düsseldorf, Jüchen, Monheim, Mönchengladbach, Willich, Krefeld
 2003: Gronau, Isle park / Losser (NL) – joint garden show with the neighbouring Dutch town
 2005: Leverkusen, „Discover new territory", Neuland-Park
 2008: Rietberg, „dream things up"
 2010: Hemer, „Spell of transformation"
 2014: Zülpich, „Zülpich Millennium Gardens - From Roman times to the 21st century"
 2017: Bad Lippspringe, „Splendor of flowers & forest idyll"
 2020: Kamp-Lintfort
 2023: Höxter

Rheinland-Pfalz 
 2000: Regional Garden Show Kaiserslautern
 2004: Regional Garden Show Trier
 2008: Regional Garden Show Bingen am Rhein
 2011: State Garden Show Koblenz
 2015: Regional Garden Show Landau in der Pfalz (originally planned for 2014, postponed by one year on 30 July 2013 due to numerous dud bombs found during the Second World War)

Sachsen 
 1996: Lichtenstein
 1999: Zittau/Olbersdorf
 2002: Großenhain
 2006: Oschatz
 2009: Reichenbach/Vogtland
 2012: Löbau
 2015: Oelsnitz/Erzgeb., „Blütenträume – Lebensräume"
 2019: Frankenberg, „Natürlich mittendrin"
 2022: Torgau

Sachsen-Anhalt 

 2004: Zeitz
 2006: Wernigerode
 2010: Aschersleben, „Nature finds town"
 2018: Burg

Schleswig-Holstein 
 2008: Schleswig-Königswiesen
 2011: Norderstedt, „dreifach einmalig"
 2016: Eutin, „Eins werden mit der Natur"
 2020: a "cross-border garden show" is planned in Flensburg and Sonderburg on the occasion of the 100th anniversary of the referendum in Schleswig

Thüringen 

 2000: Pößneck
 2004: Nordhausen, „The new middle"
 2015: Schmalkalden, „Gardentimetravel"
 2017: Apolda, „Flowering time Apolda"
 2024: Leinefelde-Worbis, „Reconciliation between town and countryside"

Austria

Upper Austria 

 1997: Krenglbach 
 1999: Gmunden 
 2005: Bad Hall 
 2007: Vöcklabruck 
 2009: Bad Schallerbach 
 2011: Ansfelden
 2015: Bad Ischl 
 2017: Kremsmünster 
 2019: Schlägl 
 2021: Wilhering
 2023: Wolfsegg am Hausruck
 2025: Schärding

Lower Austria 
 2006: Kamptal
 2008: Garten Tulln and Castle Park Grafenegg
 2012: Wachau

See also 
 Bundesgartenschau

References

External links

Garden festivals in Germany